Prince Andreas of Saxe-Coburg and Gotha, Duke of Saxony (Andreas Michael Friedrich Hans Armin Siegfried Hubertus Prinz von Sachsen-Coburg und Gotha Herzog von Sachsen; born 21 March 1943) is a German landowner and nobleman who has been the head of the House of Saxe-Coburg and Gotha since 1998. He is the grandson of Charles Edward, the last ruling duke of Saxe-Coburg and Gotha. He is thus a great-great grandson of Queen Victoria of the United Kingdom, by direct male line, and was a third cousin of Queen Elizabeth II.

Early life

Prince Andreas was born at Schloss Casel in Lower Lusatia to Friedrich Josias, Prince of Saxe-Coburg and Gotha and the former Countess Viktoria-Luise of Solms-Baruth; his parents divorced in 1946. In 1949, he moved to New Orleans in the United States, where he spent his childhood with his mother and her second husband, Richard Whitten.

Prince Andreas became heir apparent to the headship of the ducal house on 6 March 1954, when his father became the head. From the age of 16, he made regular visits to Germany in preparation for his future role as head of the ducal house, permanently returning in 1965. He completed his military service between 1966 and 1968 in the Armoured Reconnaissance Battalion 6 based in Eutin, Schleswig-Holstein. After leaving the army, he trained as a timber merchant in Hamburg from 1969 to 1971.

Head of the house

Prince Andreas succeeded to the headship of the ducal house upon his father's death on 23 January 1998.

In 2006, Prince Andreas created the Ducal Saxe-Coburg and Gotha House Order, which is based on the extinct Ducal Saxe-Ernestine House Order. Prince Andreas is a first cousin of King Carl XVI Gustaf of Sweden. He is the godfather of the King's younger daughter, Princess Madeleine, Duchess of Hälsingland and Gästrikland.

Prince Andreas is the owner of Callenberg Castle in Coburg and Greinburg Castle in Grein, Austria. He manages the family estates including farms, forests and real estate.

Marriage and issue

In Hamburg civilly on 18 June and religiously on 31 July 1971, Prince Andreas married Carin Dabelstein (b. Hamburg, 16 July 1946), daughter of Adolf Wilhelm Martin Dabelstein, manufacturer and merchant, and wife Irma Maria Margarete Callsen. The marriage, although unequal, is not morganatic, as it was authorized by Andreas's father.

They have three children, who inherit the ducal styles and titles: 

Princess Stephanie Sibylla of Saxe-Coburg and Gotha (b. Hamburg, 31 January 1972).. Married Jan Stal in 2018
Hubertus Michael, Hereditary Prince of Saxe-Coburg and Gotha (b. Hamburg, 16 September 1975), heir apparent to the headship. Married to Kelly Jeanne Rondesvedt civilly on 21 May 2009 in Coburg and religiously on 23 May 2009 at Callenberg Castle. Together they have three children:
Princess Katharina Victoria Elizabeth Cheryl of Saxe-Coburg and Gotha (b. Munich, 30 April 2014)
Prince Philipp of Saxe-Coburg and Gotha (b. Munich, 15 July 2015)
Princess Madeleine Aurelia Viktoria Carin (b. Munich, 22 February 2017) 
Prince Alexander Philip of Saxe-Coburg and Gotha (b. Coburg, 4 May 1977).

Honours

 House of Saxe-Coburg and Gotha: Co-Sovereign Knight Grand Cross of the Ducal Saxe-Coburg and Gotha House Order
 : Recipient of the 70th Birthday Badge Medal of King Carl XVI Gustaf (30 April 2016)

Ancestry

Patrilineal descent

Theodoric I of Wettin, c. 916-976
Dedo I, Count of Wettin, 950–1009
Theodoric II, Margrave of Lower Lusatia, c. 990-1034
Thimo the Brave, Count of Wettin, c. 1015–1090/1091 or 1100
Conrad, Margrave of Meissen, c. 1097-1157
Otto II, Margrave of Meissen, 1125–1190
Theodoric I, Margrave of Meissen, 1162–1221
Henry III, Margrave of Meissen, 1215–1288
Albert II, Margrave of Meissen, 1240–1314
Frederick I, Margrave of Meissen, 1257–1323
Frederick II, Margrave of Meissen, 1310–1349
Frederick III, Landgrave of Thuringia, 1332–1381
Frederick I, Elector of Saxony, 1370–1428
Frederick II, Elector of Saxony, 1412–1464
Ernest, Elector of Saxony, 1441–1486
John, Elector of Saxony, 1468–1532
John Frederick I, Elector of Saxony, 1503–1554
Johann Wilhelm, Duke of Saxe-Weimar, 1530–1573
Johann II, Duke of Saxe-Weimar, 1570–1605
Ernest I, Duke of Saxe-Gotha, 1601–1675
John Ernest IV, Duke of Saxe-Coburg-Saalfeld, 1658-1729
Francis Josias, Duke of Saxe-Coburg-Saalfeld, 1697–1764
Ernest Frederick, Duke of Saxe-Coburg-Saalfeld, 1724–1800
Francis, Duke of Saxe-Coburg-Saalfeld, 1750–1806
Ernest I, Duke of Saxe-Coburg and Gotha, 1784–1844
Albert, Prince Consort, 1819–1861
Prince Leopold, Duke of Albany, 1853–1884
Charles Edward, Duke of Saxe-Coburg and Gotha, 1884–1954
Friedrich Josias, Prince of Saxe-Coburg and Gotha, 1918–1998
Andreas, Prince of Saxe-Coburg and Gotha, b. 1943

Notes

External links

 Website of Andreas, Prince of Saxe-Coburg and Gotha
 Callenberg Castle website

1943 births
Living people
People from Dahme-Spreewald
People from the Province of Brandenburg
House of Saxe-Coburg and Gotha (United Kingdom)
Princes of Saxe-Coburg and Gotha